White Lies for Dark Times is a blues-rock album by Ben Harper and Relentless7. It was released on May 5, 2009, and is Harper's first album with the Texas-based backing band Relentless7, and his ninth album overall.

Track listing

Deluxe Edition DVD

Charts

Personnel
Ben Harper - vocals/slide guitar
Jason Mozersky - guitar
Jesse Ingalls - bass
Jordan Richardson - drums

Certifications

References

2009 albums
Ben Harper albums
Virgin Records albums